The Poor Clares of Perpetual Adoration (PCPA) are a branch of the Poor Clares, a contemplative order of nuns in the Franciscan tradition. Founded in France in 1854 by Marie Claire Bouillevaux, the Poor Clares of Perpetual Adoration are cloistered nuns dedicated to the perpetual adoration of the Blessed Sacrament.

Presence in the United States
In the United States, the first foundation was established in Cleveland, Ohio. in 1921. One of the order's best-known members was Mother Angelica, the foundress of the Eternal Word Television Network. Their motherhouse is in Canton, Ohio. There is a second community at Our Lady of Solitude Monastery in Tonopah, Arizona, near Phoenix. It is located within the Diocese of Phoenix and operates independently of the diocese, with the approval of the local bishop. Recent years have seen the consolidation of their monasteries in the United States.

References 

Catholic female orders and societies
Religious organizations established in 1854
Poor Clares
Catholic religious orders established in the 19th century
Catholic Church in Arizona
1854 establishments in France